This is list of results that England have played from 1900 to 1909.

1900 
Scores and results list England's points tally first.

1901 
Scores and results list England's points tally first.

1902 
Scores and results list England's points tally first.

1903 
Scores and results list England's points tally first.

1904 
Scores and results list England's points tally first.

1905 
Scores and results list England's points tally first.

1906 
Scores and results list England's points tally first.

1907 
Scores and results list England's points tally first.

1908 
Scores and results list England's points tally first.

1909 
Scores and results list England's points tally first.

Year Box

Notes 

1900-09
1899–1900 in English rugby union
1900–01 in English rugby union
1901–02 in English rugby union
1902–03 in English rugby union
1903–04 in English rugby union
1904–05 in English rugby union
1905–06 in English rugby union
1906–07 in English rugby union
1907–08 in English rugby union
1908–09 in English rugby union